Hemphill Independent School District is a public school district based in Hemphill, Texas (USA).

In 2009, the school district was rated "academically acceptable" by the Texas Education Agency.

Campuses
Hemphill High (Grades 9-12)
Hemphill Middle (Grades 5-8)
Hemphill Elementary (Grades PK-4)

References

External links
Hemphill ISD

School districts in Sabine County, Texas